Catamacta rureana is a species of moth of the family Tortricidae. It is found in New Zealand.

References

Moths described in 1875
Archipini
Moths of New Zealand